Hasenfratz or Hassenfratz is a surname.

Notable people with the surname include:
Anna Hasenfratz, Hungarian-American physicist, sister of Péter
Frank Hasenfratz (1935–2022), Hungarian-born Canadian billionaire businessman
Hans-Peter Hasenfratz (1938–2016), Swiss religious scholar
Jean Henri Hassenfratz (born 1755), French chemist, physics professor, mine inspector, and participant in the French Revolution
Linda Hasenfratz (born 1966), Canadian businesswoman
Mike Hasenfratz (born 1966), Canadian hockey referee
 (1946–2016), Hungarian-Swiss physicist, brother of Anna

Surnames